Luci Ward (1907–1969) was an American screenwriter. She mostly worked on crime B movies and Western films.

Biography 
Ward was born and raised in Monroe, Louisiana, the daughter of Edgar Ward and Lucille Pipes. She had a brother, Royce, and two step-siblings from her father's second marriage (her mother died when she was young).

Ward began her career as a secretary to First National executives and screenwriters (including Ben Markson) before becoming a script girl. Later, she got a chance to pen her own scripts. She also wrote articles for publications like Cosmopolitan, sometimes using the pen name Brooks Nevins.

She testified at a National Labor Relations Board hearing that she was hired as a stenographer at Warner Brothers for $25 a week and wasn't given a raise when she was promoted to screenwriter. Warner Brothers then hired her a personal secretary at $32.50 a week.

She was married to fellow screenwriter Jack Natteford and co-wrote several films with him.

Selected filmography
 Murder by an Aristocrat (1936)
 Mountain Justice (1937)
 Melody for Two (1937)
 Call the Mesquiteers (1938)
 Red River Range (1938)
 The Kansas Terrors (1939)
 The Arizona Kid (1939)
 Beyond the Sacramento (1940)
 Bad Men of the Hills (1942)
 The Fighting Buckaroo (1943)
 Law of the Northwest (1943)
 Riding West (1944)
 Raiders of Ghost City (1944)
 Dick Tracy vs. Cueball (1946)
 Return of the Bad Men (1948)
 Rustlers (1949)

References

Bibliography
 Jill Nelmes & Jule Selbo. Women Screenwriters: An International Guide. Palgrave Macmillan, 2015.
 Pitts, Michael R. Western Movies: A Guide to 5,105 Feature Films. McFarland, 2012.

External links

1907 births
1969 deaths
American women screenwriters
20th-century American women writers
20th-century American screenwriters